The Gymnastics competitions in the 1970 Summer Universiade were held in Turin, Italy.

Men's events

Women's events

References
 Universiade gymnastics medalists on HickokSports

1970 in gymnastics
1970 Summer Universiade
Gymnastics at the Summer Universiade